Laurent Wéry (born 1975 in Aalst, Belgium) is a Belgian DJ and producer. He released his debut album Ready for the Night in Belgium on 19 July 2010. He became more popular with his single "Hey Hey Hey (Pop Another Bottle)" which features vocals from Swift K.I.D. & Dev.

Music career

2009–2010: Ready for the Night
Laurent Wéry released his first solo single "My Sound" on 14 February 2009 on La Musique du Beau Monde. The song reached number 20 in the official Belgian singleschart Ultratop. "Looking At Me (J'aime regarder)" was released on 8 July 2009 as his second single. "On the Dancefloor" was released as the third single on 11 September 2009. "Nagasaki" was released on 16 November 2009 as the fourth single. "Get Down" was released as the fifth single on 1 March 2010. His debut album Ready for the Night was released on 19 July 2010, only charting at number 95 in Belgium. The sixth and final single from the album "Ready for the Night" was released on 22 July 2010.

2011–present: Second album
On 3 January 2011 Laurent released "Salva Mea" as the lead single from his upcoming second studio album. "Hey Hey Hey (Pop Another Bottle)" was released on 26 September 2011 as the second single from the album featuring vocals from Swift K.I.D. and Dev, the song peaked to number 16 in Belgium, it also charted at number 47 on the Irish Singles Chart, 2 on the Australian Singles Chart and number 14 on the US Billboard Hot Dance Club Songs chart.

Discography

Albums

Singles

References

Footnotes

Sources

External links
 

1975 births
Living people
Belgian DJs
Belgian dance musicians
People from Aalst, Belgium